Saint Kitts and Nevis is an island nation in the Caribbean. Its ties with CARICOM and its proximity to South and North America have allowed strong diplomatic ties with several nations.

Diplomatic relations 

List of countries which maintains diplomatic relations with Saint Kitts and Nevis: No dates are found for Belgium, Chile, Ecuador, Guyana, Haiti, India, Italy, the, Netherlands, Nigeria, Peru, Trinidad and Tobago and Turkey

Table

See also

 Ministry of Foreign Affairs (Saint Kitts and Nevis)
 List of diplomatic missions in Saint Kitts and Nevis
 List of diplomatic missions of Saint Kitts and Nevis

References

External links
 St. Kitts & Nevis Ministry of Foreign Affairs

 
Saint Kitts and Nevis and the Commonwealth of Nations